Rodenbach may refer to:
 Rodenbach Brewery, a brewery from Roeselare, Belgium

Places
 Rodenbach, Hesse, in the Main-Kinzig district, Hesse, Germany 
 Rodenbach, Rhineland-Palatinate, in the district of Kaiserslautern, Rhineland-Palatinate, Germany 
 Rodenbach bei Puderbach, in the district of Neuwied, Rhineland-Palatinate, Germany

Rivers 
 Rodenbach (Eisbach), a river in Rhineland-Palatinate, Germany
 Rodenbach (Wapelbach), a river in  North Rhine-Westphalia, Germany

People
 Georges Rodenbach (1855–1898), Belgian author
 Albrecht Rodenbach (1856–1880), Belgian author

See also 
 Rodenbachfonds, a Flemish non-profit cultural organisation for the promotion and support of the Dutch language in Flanders, named after Albrecht Rodenbach